Below is a list of notable footballers who have played for HNK Rijeka. The first table includes players who have played 50 or more official matches or scored more than 10 goals for the club since 1974–75. The second table includes players who have played 50 or more Yugoslav First League matches or scored more than 10 goals for the club between 1958 and 1969.

For individual records see the statistics and records related article. For the current squad, see the current season article.

List of players (1974–2023)
Players are listed in alphabetical order. Appearances and goals are for first-team competitive matches, and include:
 League: Yugoslav First League (1974–91), Croatian First Football League (1992–present);
 Cup: Yugoslav Cup (1974–91), Croatian Football Cup and Croatian Football Super Cup (1992–present);
 Europe: UEFA competitions (1978–present).

Bold denotes current members of first-team squad.
Updated 13 November 2022.

List of players (1958–69)
Due to incomplete data, statistics for seasons prior to 1974–75 are only partially included in this article. The table below lists players who have played 50 or more league matches or scored more than 10 goals for Rijeka between 1958–59 and 1968–69, when the club competed in the Yugoslav First League.

List of captains

External links
Croatian Football Statistics (www.hrnogomet.com) 
Football in the former Yugoslavia (www.exyufudbal.in.rs)

References
 
 
 
 
 
 

Players
Rijeka

Association football player non-biographical articles